Patoka is the fourth largest town and sixth largest community in Gibson County, Indiana, United States. The population was 735 at the 2010 census.

History
Patoka was laid out and platted in 1813. The town's name comes from an Indian word meaning "log on bottom", on account of the many muddy logs at the bottom of the river. The Patoka post office was established in 1833.

Geography
Patoka is located at  (38.405536, -87.586260).

Demographics

2010 census
As of the census of 2010, there were 735 people, 295 households, and 215 families living in the town. The racial makeup of the town was 95.8% White, 1.1% African American, 0.4% Native American, 0.3% Asian, 0.4% from other races, and 2.0% from two or more races. Hispanic or Latino of any race were 1.0% of the population.

There were 295 households, of which 32.9% had children under the age of 18 living with them, 51.5% were married couples living together, 14.2% had a female householder with no husband present, 7.1% had a male householder with no wife present, and 27.1% were non-families. 23.1% of all households were made up of individuals, and 9.1% had someone living alone who was 65 years of age or older. The average household size was 2.49 and the average family size was 2.88.

The median age in the town was 41.4 years. 24.6% of residents were under the age of 18; 7.1% were between the ages of 18 and 24; 23.8% were from 25 to 44; 27.8% were from 45 to 64; and 16.7% were 65 years of age or older. The gender makeup of the town was 53.5% male and 46.5% female.

2000 census
As of the census of 2000, there were 749 people, 308 households, and 217 families living in the town. The racial makeup of the town was 97.06% White, 1.74% African American, 0.40% from other races, and 0.80% from two or more races. Hispanic or Latino of any race were 0.27% of the population.

There were 308 households, out of which 32.1% had children under the age of 18 living with them, 50.0% were married couples living together, 16.2% had a female householder with no husband present, and 29.5% were non-families. 25.0% of all households were made up of individuals, and 12.0% had someone living alone who was 65 years of age or older. The average household size was 2.43 and the average family size was 2.86.

In the town, the population was spread out, with 25.2% under the age of 18, 8.0% from 18 to 24, 29.2% from 25 to 44, 25.6% from 45 to 64, and 11.9% who were 65 years of age or older. The median age was 38 years. For every 100 females, there were 103.0 males. For every 100 females age 18 and over, there were 95.1 males.

The median income for a household in the town was $35,208, and the median income for a family was $40,227. Males had a median income of $33,636 versus $18,681 for females. The per capita income for the town was $16,587. About 9.6% of families and 10.8% of the population were below the poverty line, including 9.5% of those under age 18 and 17.5% of those age 65 or over.

References

1813 establishments in Indiana Territory
Towns in Gibson County, Indiana
Towns in Indiana
Evansville metropolitan area
Communities of Southwestern Indiana
Populated places established in 1813